J. Easby (full name and dates of birth and death unknown) was an English first-class cricketer.

Easby made a single appearance in first-class cricket for the Players of the North against an England XI at Dewsbury in 1878. Batting once in the match, Easby was dismissed for 13 runs by Walter Gilbert in the Players first-innings.

References

External links

Year of birth unknown
Year of death unknown
English cricketers
Players of the North cricketers